The 2001 Intercontinental Final was the twenty-third and last running of the Intercontinental Final and was the second last qualifying stage for Motorcycle speedway riders to qualify for the 2001 Speedway Grand Prix series. The Final was run on 11 August at the Västervik Speedway in Västervik, Sweden

Intercontinental Final
 11 August
  Västervik, Västervik Speedway
 Top 9 to GP Challenge

References

2001
World Individual
International sports competitions hosted by Sweden